Chipinge Airport  is an airport serving Chipinge, Manicaland Province, Zimbabwe.

See also
Transport in Zimbabwe
List of airports in Zimbabwe

References

External links
OurAirports - Chipinge
OpenStreetMap - Chipinge
Directory of Airports in Zimbabwe
 Geonames/Zimbabwe

Airports in Zimbabwe
Buildings and structures in Manicaland Province
Chipinge District